Leonardo Antonelli (6 November 1730 – 23 January 1811)  was an Italian Cardinal in the Roman Catholic Church.

Biography
A native of Senigallia, Antonelli was the nephew of Cardinal Nicolò Maria Antonelli. During the early part of his long diplomatic career, he held, among other offices, those of canon of the Vatican Basilica, Prefect of archives in the Castle of San Angelo, Secretary of the Sacred College and Assessor of the Holy Office. He was created Cardinal Priest of Santa Sabina by Pope Pius VI in the consistory of 24 April 1775, and later Dean of the Sacred College and Cardinal Bishop of Ostia-Velletri.

At the time of the French Revolution, with a view to preventing the suspension of church services, he lent his support to the vote for the civil constitution of the French clergy, decreed by the National Assembly of France (12 July 1790).

In addition to the responsible posts already mentioned, he filled those of grand penitentiary, prefect of the Signature of Justice and of the Congregation of the Index, and pro-secretary of Briefs. He assisted in the preparation of the Concordat, and was present at the election of Pope Pius VII in 1800, whom he later accompanied to Paris in 1804.  He participated in the Coronation of Napoleon Bonaparte as Emperor of the French.

In 1808, he was banished from Rome by the French to Spoleto and later to Sinigaglia, where he died, leaving to the Congregation of Propaganda bequests for the support of twelve Armenian students in the College of Urbano.

Though Antonelli has been criticized for arrogating to the papacy too arbitrary a civil power, a perusal of his letter to the bishops of Ireland reveals a more tolerant spirit than is generally attributed to him. Possessed of a rich library, he was the friend and protector of letters, and had as librarian, the learned Francesco Cancellieri. He also acquired some fame as an archaeologist.

References

Attribution

1730 births
1811 deaths
People from Senigallia
Deans of the College of Cardinals
18th-century Italian cardinals
Cardinal-bishops of Ostia
Cardinal-bishops of Palestrina
Cardinal-bishops of Porto
Members of the Holy Office
Members of the Congregation for the Propagation of the Faith
Major Penitentiaries of the Apostolic Penitentiary
Cardinals created by Pope Pius VI
19th-century Italian cardinals